Crambus reducta is a moth in the family Crambidae. It was described by Anthonie Johannes Theodorus Janse in 1922. It is found in Zimbabwe.

References

Endemic fauna of Zimbabwe
Crambini
Moths described in 1922
Moths of Africa